With the Enemy's Help is a 1912 American short silent Western film directed by Wilfred Lucas, starring Blanche Sweet and Mary Pickford.

Cast
 Charles West as The Prospector
 Blanche Sweet as The Prospector's Wife
 Mary Pickford as Faro Kate
 Charles Hill Mailes as Faro Kate's Husband
 Edna Foster as The Prospector's Daughter
 Charles Gorman as The Sheriff
 J. Jiquel Lanoe as The Claim Assessor

See also
 Mary Pickford filmography
 Blanche Sweet filmography

References

External links
 

1912 films
1912 Western (genre) films
1912 short films
American silent short films
American black-and-white films
Films directed by Wilfred Lucas
Silent American Western (genre) films
1910s American films
1910s English-language films